Auster Glacier is a glacier about  wide, flowing northwest into the southeast extremity of Amundsen Bay. It was sighted in October 1956 by an Australian National Antarctic Research Expeditions (ANARE) party led by P.W. Crohn, and named after the Auster aircraft used by ANARE in coastal exploration.

At its southwest side is Mount Tod.

See also
 List of glaciers in the Antarctic
 Glaciology

References
 

Glaciers of Enderby Land